Boozeville is an unincorporated community in Floyd County, in the U.S. state of Georgia.

History
The community's name honors the Booze family of early settlers.

References

Unincorporated communities in Floyd County, Georgia
Unincorporated communities in Georgia (U.S. state)